Nelson Nogier (born May 27, 1996) is a Canadian professional ice hockey defenseman who is currently under contract with Barys Astana of the Kontinental Hockey League (KHL). He previously played in the National Hockey League (NHL) with the Winnipeg Jets.

Playing career
Nogier played junior hockey for the Western Hockey League's Saskatoon Blades from 2011 until December 14, 2014, when he was traded to the Red Deer Rebels. In his final year of junior hockey, Nogier attained career highs in goals (4), assists (17), points (21), and plus-minus (+27). Nogier was the recipient of the 2013–14 Daryl K. (Doc) Seaman Trophy for the WHL's Scholastic Player of The Year.

The Winnipeg Jets selected Nogier in the fourth round (101st) of the 2014 NHL Entry Draft. After completing his junior career with the 2016 Memorial Cup host Red Deer Rebels, Nogier signed a three-year, two-way entry-level contract with the Jets.

Nogier attended the Winnipeg Jets 2016 preseason training camp, his second with the team, but was subsequently demoted to the Jets farm team, the Manitoba Moose, with the first round of cuts. Nogier spent most of his professional rookie season with the Moose in the American Hockey League.  He was recalled by the Jets late in the season and made his NHL debut on March 21, 2017, playing a total of 10 games.

During the  season, Nogier's six year tenure within the Jets organization ended when he was dealt at the NHL trade deadline to the Los Angeles Kings in exchange for Markus Phillips on March 21, 2022.

As a free agent from the Kings in the off-season, Nogier opted to pursue a career abroad, in agreeing to a one-year contract with Kazakh based KHL club, Barys Nur-Sultan on September 13, 2022. In the following 2022–23 season, Nogier made 49 regular season appearances for Astana, registering 8 points from the blueline.

Personal
Nogier grew up in Clavet, Saskatchewan.  His father, Pat, is a police officer with the Saskatoon Police Service and a former junior hockey player, who survived the deadly Swift Current Broncos bus crash in 1986.

Career statistics

Regular season and playoffs

International

References

External links

1996 births
Barys Nur-Sultan players
Canadian ice hockey defencemen
Ice hockey people from Saskatchewan
Living people
Manitoba Moose players
Ontario Reign (AHL) players
Red Deer Rebels players
Saskatoon Blades players
Sportspeople from Saskatoon
Winnipeg Jets draft picks
Winnipeg Jets players